The 1986 All-Ireland Senior Camogie Championship Final was the 55th All-Ireland Final and the deciding match of the 1986 All-Ireland Senior Camogie Championship, an inter-county camogie tournament for the top teams in Ireland.

Angela and Ann Downey were the stars as Kilkenny retained their title.

References

All-Ireland Senior Camogie Championship Finals
All-Ireland Senior Camogie Championship Final
All-Ireland Senior Camogie Championship Final
All-Ireland Senior Camogie Championship Final, 1986